Wu I-ding, also romanized Wu Yi-ting (born 13 November 1979) is a Taiwanese politician. She was elected to the Legislative Yuan in 2020.

Early life
Wu was born on 13 November 1979, and raised in Kaohsiung. She studied business administration at National Taiwan University, and completed a master's degree in statistics at Imperial College London.

Political career
Wu was placed on the Kuomintang party list in the 2020 legislative elections as a representative of the youth vote. Ranked ninth on the list, she was elected to the Legislative Yuan.

She  questioned the extension of tenure granted to the Transitional Justice Commission in April 2020.

In March 2020, Wu was elected to the Kuomintang Central Standing Committee.

References

1979 births
Living people
21st-century Taiwanese women politicians
Members of the 10th Legislative Yuan
Party List Members of the Legislative Yuan
Kuomintang Members of the Legislative Yuan in Taiwan
National Taiwan University alumni
Alumni of Imperial College London
Politicians of the Republic of China on Taiwan from Kaohsiung
Taiwanese expatriates in the United Kingdom